Jamaica  competed at the 2019 World Aquatics Championships in Gwangju, South Korea from 12 to 28 July.

Diving

Jamaica has entered one diver.

Men

Swimming

Jamaica has entered three swimmers.

Men

Women

References

Nations at the 2019 World Aquatics Championships
Jamaica at the World Aquatics Championships
2019 in Jamaican sport